The 2015 County Championship season, known as the LV= County Championship for sponsorship reasons, was the 116th cricket County Championship season. It was contested through two divisions: Division One and Division Two. Each team played all the others in their division both home and away.

Teams

Division One
 Team promoted from Division Two

Division Two
 Team relegated from Division One

Standings
Teams receive 16 points for a win, 8 for a tie and 5 for a draw. Bonus points (a maximum of 5 batting points and 3 bowling points) may be scored during the first 110 overs of each team's first innings.

Division One
Yorkshire were Champions of Division One with a record points total (in a 16-game championship) and record wins. Sussex and Worcestershire were relegated to County Championship Division Two.
Middlesex were deducted 1 point for slow over rate.

Division Two
Surrey were County Championship Division Two Champions and are promoted to County Championship Division One alongside Lancashire, who finished in 2nd place.
Derbyshire deducted 1 point for slow over rate, Northamptonshire deducted 2 points for slow over rate, Leicestershire deducted 16 points by ECB Disciplinary panel.

Results summary
The first fixtures began on 12 April 2015.  The final set of fixtures commenced on 22 September 2015.

Division One

Division Two

Results in full

Division One

April

May

June

July

August

September

Division Two

April

May

June

July

August

September

Statistics

Division One

Most runs

Most wickets

Division Two

Most runs

Most wickets

See also
2015 Royal London One-Day Cup
2015 NatWest t20 Blast

References

2015
County Championship